Bogodukhovsky Uyezd was an uyezd (district) in the Kharkov Governorate of the Russian Empire.

History 

This uyezd was created on April 25, 1780, by order of the Empress Catherine the Great. The administrative centre of uyezd was small town Bogodukhov. Since that time, Bogodukhov got its own coat of arms.

The uyezd had two towns (Bogodukhov and Krasnokutsk) and consisted of 18 volosts.

In the 1870s, the railway was built through the uyezd and the Bogodukhov railway station was built in 1878 in Bogodukhov.

In January 1897, according to the Russian Empire Census, the population of the uyezd was 159 806 people.

By the Soviet administrative reform of 1923, the uyezd was transformed into Bogodukhov okrug.

Demographics
At the time of the Russian Empire Census of 1897, Bogodukhovsky Uyezd had a population of 159 806. Of these, 88.2% spoke Ukrainian, 9.9% Russian, 1.6% Belarusian, 0.1% Polish, 0.1% Yiddish and 0.1% German as their native language.

Further reading 
 Селиванов А. Ф. Богодухов // Энциклопедический словарь Брокгауза и Ефрона : в 86 т. (82 т. и 4 доп.). — Т. 4. СПб., 1891.

References 

Uezds of Kharkov Governorate